Piotr Szarpak (born 21 March 1971) is a retired Polish football midfielder.

References

1971 births
Living people
Polish footballers
Widzew Łódź players
Hutnik Nowa Huta players
GKS Bełchatów players
Association football midfielders
Ekstraklasa players